The FIS Cross-Country Continental Cup (COC) is a series of second-level competitions in cross-country skiing arranged by the International Ski Federation (FIS) since 1996.

History
The Continental Cup was founded in 1996. Prior to its existence, FIS held separate competitions, FIS races, as the only competitions on the level below the World Cup. In 1990, the International Ski Federation decided to organize an official second-level series of events and from 1996, races were held worldwide according to the FIS rules. After a few years, the competitions were simplified and various individual series were gradually established. Today there are a total of nine series, each spanning one or more nations. In addition to the skiers from the participating nations, there are also regular guest starters from all nations registered within the FIS, which are also included in the rankings, but cannot collect points, for example with exchange students.

World Cup qualification
The Overall winners from the previous season's Continental Cups ar rewarded a right to start in the first World Cup period in the following season. The leaders of all COC, both men and women, at the end of a COC period have the right to start in World Cup competitions during the next World Cup period.

Continental Cups

References

External links
 Rules in the 2014–15 season
 Rules in the 2019–20 season
 2011–12 season calendar

 
Cross-country skiing competitions
Cross-Country
Recurring sporting events established in 1996